Pashupatinagar is a Bardibas-9 municipality in Mahottari District in the Janakpur Zone of south-eastern Nepal. At the time of the 1991 Nepal census it had a population of 3,241 people living in 561 individual households. Pashupatinagar is situated 10 kilometers south of bardibas. Pashupatinagar produces maize consistent with agricultural production in the rest of the Terai Region. In pashupatinagar less than100 years ago there was hardle any human homes and lot of forest, so this village was called jhakhuletol and many monkeys are in Pashupatinagar forest so this village was called Bandra. There is one government school, shree rastriya higher secondary school banarjhulla-2. There is one police post which is in ward no.2. In pashupatinagar there is Mahato caste, including yadav, Sah, chamar, magar. There is one market in pathalaiya Bazar which is situated in ward number 9. There is only one source of water, which dries in the months of chait, baishakh and jestha (appx. mid-March through mid-June).

References

External links
UN map of the municipalities of Mahottari District

Populated places in Mahottari District